Dogwood is an unincorporated community in Webster Township, Harrison County, Indiana.

History
A post office was established at Dogwood in 1890, and remained in operation until it was discontinued in 1922. The community was likely named after the dogwood tree.

References

Unincorporated communities in Harrison County, Indiana
Unincorporated communities in Indiana
Louisville metropolitan area